The 1890 international cricket season was from April 1888 to September 1888. The season consisted of a single international tour, with Australia visiting England for The Ashes series.

Season overview

July

Australia in England

References

International cricket competitions by season
1888 in cricket